Usman Bengali (d. 1570s) was a 16th-century Islamic scholar of Bengal. He is mostly associated for his great teaching in the town of Sambhal during the Mughal period. His name is mentioned in the works of ʽAbd al-Qadir Badayuni and Abd al-Hayy al-Lucknawi, where he is described as one of the most famous of the Hanafi ulama of that period.

Biography
Usman was born and raised in Bengal. He completed his education relating to Islamic studies and Qur'an, eventually earning the title of Mawlana. He later migrated to Sambhal in Hindustan where he studied under the renowned poet Miyan Hatim Sambhali. Intending to seek further knowledge, he proceeded to Gujarat where he became a student of Wajihuddin Alvi who was the teacher of Yusuf Bengali. According to the Asrariyah treatise written by Kamal Muhammad Sambhali, Usman then went back to Sambhal where he permanently settled.

During his old age, his students would regularly visit him at his home in Sambhal. On one occasion, Miyan Hatim Sambhali visited him, bringing his student ʽAbd al-Qadir Badayuni (who would later become the first Grand Mufti of India) along with him. Usman Bengali died in the town of Sambhal, in 980 AH (1572-1573 CE).

References

16th-century Bengalis
Bengali Muslim scholars of Islam
16th-century Indian Muslims

Sunni Muslims
Mughal Empire people
16th-century Muslim theologians
People from Sambhal district
1570s deaths